Benedetto Scotto (15th century – 16th century) was an Italian cartographer, mathematician and navigator.

Scotto was born in Genoa. He published a treatise in which he proposed to reach the Indies through a crossing to the North in the Arctic Sea.

His works on squaring the circle (1622) and on longitude (1623) were also published in French.

Works

References 

 

15th-century Italian cartographers
16th-century Italian mathematicians
16th-century deaths
15th-century births
Italian sailors
16th-century Italian cartographers